Keith Hollands (born 31 December 1939) is a former  Australian rules footballer who played with North Melbourne in the Victorian Football League (VFL).

Notes

External links 

Living people
1939 births
Australian rules footballers from Victoria (Australia)
North Melbourne Football Club players
Cobram Football Club players